Yeison Tolosa (born 12 June 1999) is a Colombian football player who plays as forward for Deportivo Cali in Categoría Primera A.

References

1999 births
Living people
Colombian footballers
Colombia under-20 international footballers
Categoría Primera A players
Deportivo Cali footballers
Atlético Bucaramanga footballers
Association football forwards
Footballers from Cali